Edgar William Bennett (29 March 1929 — 1 September 2008) was an English footballer who played as an outside right.

Career
Bennett began his career at Vauxhall Motors, before signing for Luton Town in September 1952. Bennett's time at Luton was mainly restricted to the reserves, making just one first team appearance in the 1953–1954 Second Division.

In 1954, Bennett joined Chelmsford City. Over the course of two seasons with the club, Bennett made 37 league appearances, scoring six times, before being released in May 1956.

References

1929 births
2008 deaths
Association football forwards
English footballers
Footballers from Stoke-on-Trent
Vauxhall Motors F.C. players
Luton Town F.C. players
Chelmsford City F.C. players
English Football League players